William Arthur Shaw  (1865–1943) was an English historian and archivist.

Life
Born on 19 April 1865, in Hooley Hill, Ashton-under-Lyne, now in Greater Manchester, he was the son of James Shaw and his wife Sarah Ann Hampshire. He graduated B.A. at Owens College in 1883.

Shaw worked for the Chetham Society, and then the Public Record Office, as an editor. In 1940 he was elected a Fellow of the British Academy. He died on 15 April 1943.

The majority of his later life was devoted to the calendaring of Treasury records of the later Stuart and early Georgian period, between 1660 and 1745. These were published with extensive introductions, charting his view of the development of the national financial administration and other topics, and often challenging the received wisdom.  F.H. Slingsby, who brought Shaw's posthumous final volumes to press, considered that the "animosities" expressed in some of these introductions were "usually well founded"; although P.G.M. Dickson considered that "Shaw's views were curiously vehement and often based on inaccurate data, and must be treated with caution."  In particular, Shaw's summary tables of revenue and expenditure have been found to be incorrect, failing to take into account some of the intricate accounting devices of the time, leading him to incorrect conclusions.

Shaw also wrote a substantial number of entries for the Dictionary of National Biography.

Works

  5 vols, covering 1729–1745.
  32 vols, covering 1660–1718. Volumes 20 et seq published posthumously. 
  3 vols: vol 1; vol 2, vol 3
  1 vol
  2 vols: vol 1; vol 2
  2 vols: vol 1; vol 2

References

Further reading
 J. H. Clapham (1943), "William Arthur Shaw, 1865–1943", Proceedings of the British Academy, 29, 349–55

External links
 
William Arthur Shaw Manuscripts, John Rylands Library, University of Manchester

1865 births
1943 deaths
19th-century English historians
English archivists
Fellows of the British Academy
People from Ashton-under-Lyne
20th-century English historians